Assas (or) is a town and commune in the Hérault department, region of Occitania, southern France.

Geography
Located just north of Montpellier, Assas lies near Saint-Vincent de Barbeyrargues, Guzargues, Clapiers, Jacou, Castries and Teyran. The region near Assas is primarily scrubland, but it is watered by a number of streams and brooks and has a small wooded area that produces mushrooms in the fall.

The village of Assas is organized around the Château d'Assas, located on a hill overlooking the small but quaint old village.

Population
The inhabitants are called Assadins in French.

Viticulture
The region containing Assas is a productive wine-making area, and has the appellation Grès de Montpellier. This is part of the AOC Coteaux du Languedoc designation.

Sights
 Château d'Assas, an 18th-century folie montpellierraine, designed by the architect Jean-Antoine Giral (1700–1787), was built in 1759/1760 on the ruins of a feudal castle. It is a private residence, but can be toured either by appointment or on national holidays. A historic 18th century harpsichord is preserved in the Château, a favoured instrument of harpsichordist Scott Ross (1951–1989), who died in Assas.  At the beginning of the 1920s, Sir Patrick Geddes (born Ballater, Scotland 2 October 1854, died Montpellier, France 17 April 1932), the Scottish botanist, bought the Château d'Assas to set up a centre for urban studies, as an extension of the Collège des Ecossais which he founded in Montpellier in 1890. The château was used as a set in the filming of La Belle Noiseuse, a film by Jacques Rivette (1991).
 A church of the 11th or 12th century, completely restored at the beginning of the 21st century.
 Remains of the 10th or 11th century fortifications.
 Old village.

See also
Communes of the Hérault department

References

External links

 Commune d'Assas, official website
 Assas photos – not an official site

Communes of Hérault